Yèvre is the name of two rivers in France:
 Yèvre (Cher)
 Yèvre (Marne)